Guise is a surname possibly derived from the Guise baronets of England or from Guise, commune in France. It is less commonly used as a given name. Notable people with the name include:

Given name
Guise Brittan (1809–1876), New Zealand farmer and politician

Surname
Anthony Guise (born 1985), French footballer
Christopher Guise (died 1670), English politician
Dianne Guise (born 1952), Australian politician
John Guise (Governor-General) (1914–1991), the first Governor-General of Papua New Guinea
Martin Guise (1780–1828), British-Peruvian admiral
William Guise (c. 1653 – 1683), English orientalist
Wyndham Guise (active 1913–1929), British actor

See also
Guise (disambiguation)
John Guise (disambiguation)
Mademoiselle de Guise (disambiguation)
Michel DeGuise (born 1951), Canadian ice hockey player
William Guise (disambiguation)